The long-eared chipmunk (Neotamias quadrimaculatus), also called the Sacramento chipmunk or the four-banded chipmunk, is a species of rodent in the squirrel family, Sciuridae. It is endemic to the central and northern Sierra Nevada of California and Nevada in the United States. Long-eared chipmunks have the longest ears of all species of chipmunks.

Description
The chipmunks are bright red-brown in color, displaying five dark stripes and four pale stripes on their backs. They also have large, noticeable white patches at the base of both ears.

Behavior
Long-eared chipmunks are diurnal. They forage on the ground for fungi, seeds, fruits, flowers, and insects, though in the fall they will climb conifer trees to eat seeds from the cones. The chipmunks hibernate in a den on the ground from November until March, and live in burrows or tree hollows the rest of the year. They mate in late April and May, and the young are born after one month of gestation.

References

Neotamias
Fauna of the Sierra Nevada (United States)
Endemic fauna of California
Endemic fauna of Nevada
Mammals of the United States
Rodents of North America
Mammals described in 1867
Taxonomy articles created by Polbot